Pseudotropheus perileucos is a species of cichlid endemic to Lake Malawi where it is only known to occur around Likoma Island where it prefers rocky habitats, sometimes near to the interface with sandy substrates. This species can grow to a length of  SL.

References

perileucos
Fish described in 1997
Taxonomy articles created by Polbot